Milenijum (English: Millennium) is the eight studio album by Bosnian Serb singer Indira Radić, released in 2000.

Track listing

References

2002 albums
Indira Radić albums
Grand Production albums